Adele Marion Fielde (March 30, 1839 – February 23, 1916) was a social activist, Baptist missionary, scientist, and writer.

Biography
Adelia Field was born in East Rodman, New York on March 30, 1839. Her parents were Leighton Field and Sophia Field. She graduated from New York State Normal School in Albany in 1860. From 1883 to 1885, she studied medicine at the Medical College of Pennsylvania. Fielde also studied biology for two years at the Philadelphia Academy of Natural Sciences, but did not receive a formal degree.

At age 27, her fiancé, Reverent Cyrus A. Chilcott, went to Thailand to engage in missionary work among the local Chinese, and she followed, only to find he had passed several weeks before her arrival. She never married.

In 1894, after the defeat of the women's suffrage amendment to the New York State constitution, Fielde was one of six prominent suffragists who founded the League for Political Education. She worked with other suffragists to establish the Volunteer Committee with the goal of targeting New York society, using her wealth and status she established as a missionary in China to facilitate her efforts.

Key research contributions

Fielde made significant contributions to myrmecology, the study of ants. In particular, she devised the 'Fielde Nest', a portable observation nest that she then used to enable precise observations of ant behaviour, and which was also used by others including William Morton Wheeler. She published over 20 papers about ants in less than 10 years. She carried out her myrmecological research at Woods Hole, Massachusetts, one of the few institutions that was sympathetic to female students at that time. In addition to studying there, she also gave lectures. Key discoveries include demonstrating that ants use their antennae to recognise nestmates and that ants react to vibrations in the ground detected via their legs, rather than 'hearing' sound travelling through the air.

Fielde also wrote a comprehensive dictionary and guide to the Chinese Teochew language, and was known to locals as "Miss Fielde".

Selected works

References

1839 births
Baptist missionaries in China
1916 deaths
American women scientists
American entomologists
Women entomologists
Myrmecologists
American zoologists
Hymenopterists
People from Jefferson County, New York
American expatriates in China
Baptist missionaries from the United States
Female Christian missionaries
20th-century American women writers
20th-century American writers
19th-century American women writers
19th-century American writers
Baptists from New York (state)
American expatriates in Thailand